Hextech Mayhem: A League of Legends Story is a rhythm video game developed by Choice Provisions and published by Riot Forge, a publishing division of Riot Games, the developers of League of Legends. Hextech Mayhem was released on 16 November 2021 alongside Ruined King: A League of Legends Story. Both games use characters from League of Legends in their story and gameplay.

Reception 

Hextech Mayhem received "mixed or average" reviews according to review aggregator Metacritic.

Chris Carter of Destructoid gave the game an eight out of ten, praising the game's soundtrack for being "...some of Choice Provisions' best work" while appreciating the various mascot platforming homages strewn throughout the game.

Nintendo World Report praised the game for its sense of flow and criticized the numerous technical issues present in the Switch port of the game, calling its framerate drops "debilitating" for a rhythm game while calling the freestyle mayhem "frustrating and limiting".

References

Choice Provisions games
Single-player video games
Windows games
Nintendo Switch games
League of Legends
Rhythm games
Riot Forge games
2021 video games
Video games developed in the United States
Video game spin-offs

Video games scored by Grant Henry